Chitrangda Singh (born 30 August 1976) is an Indian actress who works primarily in Hindi cinema. She made her acting debut in 2005 with Hazaaron Khwaishein Aisi for which she won Bollywood Movie Award – Best Female Debut.

Singh has starred in films like Yeh Saali Zindagi (2011), Desi Boyz (2011), I, Me Aur Main (2013), Baazaar (2018) and Bob Biswas (2021). She turned Producer with the film Soorma (2018).

Early life and education
Chitrangda Singh was born on 30 August in Jodhpur, Rajasthan, growing up there as well as in Kota, Rajasthan, and also Bareilly and Meerut in Uttar Pradesh, the latter city being the last where her father, Col. Niranjan Singh, an ex-Indian Army officer with a transferable job, was posted. Her brother Digvijay Singh Chahal is a golfer. After her schooling in Meerut  at Sophia Girls' School, she completed her graduation in Home Science (food and nutrition) from Lady Irwin College, New Delhi.

Personal life
Chitrangda Singh was married to golfer Jyoti Randhawa. After a five-year-long courtship, the couple married in 2001. They have a son named Zorawar. Chitrangada and her husband separated in 2013 and then formally got divorced in April 2015. The custody of their son was granted to Chitrangada.

Career

Modelling career
Singh began her career as a model before making the transition to the silver screen. After completing her college education she began modeling with brands like ICICI bank and Alukkas Jewellery among others. She got fame highlighted in Tum To Thehre Pardesi Album sung by Altaf Raja.

She drew attention after performing in a music video Sunset Point by Gulzar. A music video of singer Abhijeet Bhattacharya followed.

Film debut and sabbatical (2005-2010)
Singh made her much acclaimed debut with Sudhir Mishra's film Hazaaron Khwaishein Aisi in 2005. The role got her wide acclaim: a review in The Washington Post noted her for giving "her character a deep sense of dignity and decency." After that Chitrangada acted in the 2005 film Kal: Yesterday and Tomorrow.

She took a break from acting from 2005 to 2008. In 2008, she made her comeback with the leading role opposite Sanjay Suri in the director Onir's romantic-comedy, Sorry Bhai!. Its release over the weekend of the Mumbai terror attacks proved disastrous at the box office.

Commercial cinema (2011–present)
She starred in Rohit Dhawan's Desi Boyz in 2011.she played the role of an economics teacher opposite Akshay Kumar. Desi Boyz also starred John Abraham and Deepika Padukone.
In 2012, she performed an item number in Shirish Kunder's Joker.

Her next movie was I, Me Aur Main with John Abraham in 2013. She got together again with her mentor Sudhir Mishra for a short movie Kirchiyaan and for the film Inkaar in 2013. In 2014, she then appeared in a special song with Suriya in Tamil film Anjaan.

In 2015, she again performed a special song with Akshay Kumar for the second time in his film, Gabbar Is Back. She will next be seen in "Bob Biswas".

In 2019, Singh starred in Baazaar opposite Saif Ali Khan.

Other work

Singh is a brand ambassador for Airtel, Parachute, Puma, Borges Olive Oil, Garnier, Aliva Crackers, Taj Mahal Tea and Joyalukkas Jewellers. She also endorses Tata Group's Tanishq and Titan Eye Plus.

Filmography

Films
 All films are in Hindi unless otherwise noted.

Television

Web series

Awards and nominations

References

External links

 
 

1976 births
Living people
Indian film actresses
Actresses in Hindi cinema
People from Jodhpur
Actresses from Rajasthan